is a Japanese feminine given name.

Possible writings
The name Chie can be written multiple ways depending on the kanji used. It can also be written using hiragana or katakana. Some possible ways to write Chie include:

智恵, "wisdom, blessing"
千絵, "thousand, pictures"
千枝, "thousand, branches"
千恵, "thousand, blessings"
知恵, "wisdom, blessing"
智栄, "wisdom, prosperous"
茅江, "miscanthus, estuary"
致依, "cause, do, reliable"
稚慧, "young, wise"
地絵, "ground, earth, picture"
知映, "knowledge, shine"
治映, "govern, shine"
千映, "thousand, shine"
千栄, "thousand, prosperous"

People

Those with the name Chie include:

Chie Kajiura (チエ・カジウラ), Japanese singer
, Japanese field hockey player
Chie Kōjiro (神代知衣, born 1960), Japanese voice actress
Chie Matsuura (born 1980), Japanese voice actress
Chie Mukai (向井千恵, born 1953), Japanese composer and improv musician
Chie Nakamura (中村千絵, born 1979), Japanese voice actress
Chie Nakane (中根千枝), author and anthropologist
, Japanese ice hockey player
Chie Sawaguchi (沢口千恵, born 1975), also known as Chie Ishibashi, a Japanese voice actress
Chie Shinohara (篠原千絵), Japanese manga artist
Chie Tanabe (田邊智恵, born 1971), Japanese stuntwoman
Chie Tanaka (田中千絵, born 1981), Japanese model and actress
Chie Tsuji (辻知恵, born 1969), Japanese volleyball player
Chie Yamayoshi, Los Angeles-based Japanese videogame artist and filmmaker

Characters 
 Chie Harada, a character in the anime series My-HiME and My-Otome
 Chie Maruyama, a character in the manga Uzumaki
 Chie Sahara, a character in the tokusatsu series Daitetsujin 17
 Chie Satonaka, a character from the video game Persona 4
Jarinko Chie, manga.

Japanese feminine given names